The Limba language, Hulimba, is a Niger-Congo language of Sierra Leone and Guinea. It is not closely related to other languages and appears to form its own branch of the Niger–Congo family. Dialects include Tonko, Sela, Kamuke (or Ke), Wara-wara, Keleng, Biriwa, and Safroko. The eastern variety, spoken primarily in Guinea, is quite distinct. Limba has a system of noun classes, marked by an old, eroded set of prefixes augmented by a newer set of enclitics.

Distribution
Ethnologue lists the following two varieties of Limba, spoken in Guinea and Sierra Leone.

East Limba is spoken in Ouré-Kaba, Guinea.

West-Central Limba is spoken in northern Sierra Leone. It is spoken in the Little Scarcies River area in east Bombali District and northeast Kambia District, as well as north of Makeni.

Phonology
Like neighboring Temne, Limba has an unusual contrast among its consonants. It distinguishes dental and alveolar, but the dental consonants are apical and the alveolar consonants are laminal, the opposite of the general pattern.

Grammar

Noun classes
Noun classes are distinguished by the form of the definite article (class particle) which follows the noun, and sometimes also by a prefix. Roughly, the following classes can be deduced from the examples given by Mary Lane Clarke:

A. Person Class
 Examples: 
 Wukọnọ wo - a Kono person; 
 sapiri wo - crowbar;
 kaň wo - the sun
Definite article (follows the noun): wo; pronoun ("he, she, it" as subject): wunde, wun

B. People Class
 Examples:
 Bikọnọ be - Kono people;
 sapiriň be - crowbars;
  bia be - people, ancestors
Def. art.: be; pronoun: bende, ben

C. Language Class
 Examples:
 Hukọnọ ha - the Kono language;
  - toe
Def. art.: ha; pronoun: -?- (presumably this is neuter according to class, and so on through the neuter classes)

D. Country Class
 Examples:
 Kakọnọ ka - Konoland
Def. art.: ka

E. Bodkins Class
 Examples:
  - bodkins;
  - toe
Def. art.: ta

F. Cascade Class
 Examples:
 kutintọ ko - cascade;
 kekeň ko - country;
 kutiň ko - dog
Def. art.: ko

G. Dogs Class, plurals of F.
 Examples:
 ňatintọ ňa - cascades;
 ňakeň ňa - countries
 ňatiň ňa - dogs
Def. art.: ňa

H. Arrival Class
 Examples:
 matebeň ma - calm (noun);
 matalaň ma - arrival;
 masandiň ma - needle
Def. art.: ma

I. Needles Class, plurals of H.
 Examples:
 masandi ma - needles;
 matubucuciň ma - signs;
 mendeň ma - days, sleeps
Def. art.: ma

J. Yam Class
 Examples:
 ndamba ki - yam;
 nbēn ki (the b is a "smothered b") - bracelet;
 nkala ki - vine
Def. art.: ki

K. Bracelets Class, plurals of J.
 Examples: 
 ndambeň ki - yams;
 nbēni ki ("smothered b" as above) - bracelets;
 nbuliň ki (also with "smothered b") - windpipes
Def. art.: ki

L. Meat Class
 Examples:
 piňkari ba - gun, musket;
 bọňa ba (bọňa has "smothered b", as above) - path, way;
 bara ba - meat, flesh
Def. art.: ba

M. Boxes Class, plurals of L.
 Examples:
 piňkariň ba - guns, muskets;
 bọňeň ba (bọňeň also has "smothered b") - paths, ways;
 kankaren ba - boxes, trunks
Def. art.: ba

N. Yarn Class
Examples:
  - woof, yarn;
  - suffering;
  - fan
Def. art.: mu

O. Waves Class
 Examples:
 muňkuliň mu - waves;
 mudọňiň mu - habitations
Def. art.: mu

P. Kusini-fruits Class
 Examples:
 busini bu - fruits of the kusini tree
Def. art.: bu

Q. A class with definite article wu
 Examples: - ? -

Other nouns, including nouns of quantity, etc., take no article. It may be that they are classless:
 Examples:
 Alukorana - the Qur'an (Arabic);
 disa - fringe, shawl;
 duba - ink (from Mandingo);
 kameci - late, brown rice

References

Further reading
Clarke, Mary Lane. 1922 [1971]. A Limba-English Dictionary or Tampeṅ Ta Ka Taluṅ Ta Ka Hulimba Ha In Huiṅkilisi Ha. Westmead, Farnborough: Gregg International Publishers Limited. (1971 reprint of 1922 book published by Houghton.)
Guillaume Segerer & Florian Lionnet 2010. "'Isolates' in 'Atlantic'". Language Isolates in Africa workshop, Lyon, Dec. 4

Atlantic languages
Languages of Sierra Leone
Languages of Guinea